Overlay may refer to:

Computers
Overlay network, a computer network which is built on top of another network
Hardware overlay, one type of video overlay that uses memory dedicated to the application
Another term for exec, replacing one process by another
Overlay (programming), a technique to reduce the amount of memory used by a program
Overlay keyboard, a specialized keyboard with no pre-set keys
Keyboard overlay, a sheet of printed text sitting between the keys, depicting an alternate keyboard layout
Vector overlay, an analysis procedure in a geographic information system for integrating multiple data sets

Other uses
Overlay architecture, temporary elements that supplement existing buildings and infrastructure for major sporting events or festivals
Overlay control, in semiconductor manufacturing, for monitoring layer-to-layer alignment on multi-layer device structures 
Overlay plan, a method of introducing new area codes in telephony
Historic overlay district, a zoning district that applies special rules to a portion of other districts, usually for historic or conservation reasons
Video overlay, techniques to display video on computer display
When the payoffs in gambling are greater than the costs; see Advantage gambling

See also

 Layover (disambiguation)
 Over (disambiguation)
 Lay (disambiguation)
 Overlap (disambiguation)
 Overload (disambiguation)
 Superposition (disambiguation)